Armenia competed in the 2008 Summer Olympics in Beijing, China. A team of 25 athletes, consisting of 9 wrestlers, 6 weightlifters, 4 boxers, 2 athletes, 2 judokas, 1 sport shooter and 1 swimmer was selected. With a total of six bronze medals, Armenia won more medals than in all previous Olympic Games combined.

Medalists

Athletics

Men

Women

Boxing

Armenia had four boxers qualify for the Olympics. Javakhyan and Hambardzumyan qualified in their weight classes at the World Boxing Championships. Hakobyan qualified in the middleweight at the first European qualifying tournament.

Judo

Shooting

Men

Swimming

Men

Weightlifting

Men

Women

Wrestling

Men's freestyle

Men's Greco-Roman

References

External links 
National Olympics Committee of Armenia website
25 ARMENIAN SPORTSMEN IN “BEIJING 2008”

2008 in Armenian sport
Nations at the 2008 Summer Olympics
2008